Teutonia may refer to:
 Germany
 K.D.St.V. Teutonia, an academic German fraternity in Fribourg, Switzerland.
 Teutonia Maennerchor Hall in (Deutschtown) Pittsburgh, PA
 Teutônia, a municipality in Brazil
 1044 Teutonia, an asteroid 
 The land of the Teutons
 Free Society of Teutonia
 Monastic State of the Teutonic Knights
 Teutonia (ship)
 Teutonia (mite), genus of mites
 FC Teutonia Ottensen, a German association football club
 Teutonia Watzenborn-Steinberg, a German association football club